Anu Mohan (born 24 August 1990) is an Indian actor who works in Malayalam films.

Career
He made his debut in the 2011 film, Orkut oru Ormakut. He also played the antagonist in Roopesh Peethambaran's Theevram. Anu Mohan is the younger brother of actor Vinu Mohan. His upcoming project is débutante Haider Ali's Pianist. He is also currently slated to play the lead in Mirror.

Personal life
Anu Mohan is the grandson of actor Kottarakkara Sreedharan Nair. His mother is the actress Shobha Mohan, and he is the brother of actor Vinu Mohan.

Filmography

Feature films
All films are in Malayalam language unless otherwise noted.

Short films

References

Living people
Male actors from Thiruvananthapuram
Male actors in Malayalam cinema
Indian male film actors
21st-century Indian male actors
1990 births